Zarco is a surname. Notable people with the surname include:

 João Gonçalves Zarco (c. 1390–1471), Portuguese explorer
 Jorge Rodríguez (born 1979), Salvadoran football player
 Johann Zarco (born 1990), Grand Prix motorcycle racer from France